Joseph Cephas S. Rogers (died 21 January 1946) was a West Indian cricketer who played for Trinidad and Tobago cricket team between 1908 and 1922. He took fifty-one wickets at a bowling average of 16.74, and scored six half-centuries with the bat. He died in Trinidad. He also represented the West Indies cricket team during a 1910/11 tour by the Marylebone Cricket Club.

References
Notes

Sources

1946 deaths
Date of birth unknown
Pre-1928 West Indies cricketers
Trinidad and Tobago cricketers